The diving competitions at the 2019 Southeast Asian Games in Philippines took place at New Clark City Aquatics Center in Carpas from 6 to 7 December 2019.

Malaysia has dominated all diving events.

Schedule

Results
The 2019 Games features competitions in four events.

Individual

Men's 3 metre springboard

Women's 3 metre springboard

Synchronised

Men's synchronised 3 metre springboard

Women's synchronised 3 metre springboard

References

External links
 

Results